"He Wasn't Man Enough" is a song by American R&B singer and songwriter Toni Braxton. It was written by Rodney "Darkchild" Jerkins, Fred Jerkins III, LaShawn Daniels, and Harvey Mason, Jr. for her third studio album, The Heat (2000), while production was helmed by the former. "He Wasn't Man Enough" is an uptempo R&B song that differs from Braxton's previous ballads. The song was released by LaFace Records on February 29, 2000, as the lead single from the album.

The song received generally positive reviews from music critics, many of whom praised it as one of Braxton's best works. "He Wasn't Man Enough" had international success and became one of Braxton's signature songs, peaking at number two on the Billboard Hot 100, where the single stood for several weeks, and number one on the Hot R&B/Hip-Hop Songs for four weeks. As of 2019, this song is her last top 10 appearance on the Billboard Hot 100. An accompanying music video was released for the single. The song earned Braxton her fourth Grammy Award for Best Female R&B Vocal Performance and was nominated for Best R&B Song in 2001.

Background and composition
"He Wasn't Man Enough" was released as the lead single from Toni Braxton's third studio album, The Heat. The song was written by Rodney Jerkins, Fred Jerkins III, LaShawn Daniels, and Harvey Mason, Jr., while it was produced by Jerkins. The song was recorded in the United States during the production of Braxton's third studio album, between January and February 2000. During its production, L.A. Reid said "It's very strong, and very personal to her".

All instruments on "He Wasn't Man Enough" are played by Jerkins and the background vocals are sung by Braxton, Nora Payne, Sharlotte Gibson, and Jerkins. The song's vocal range starts with a D4 chord to a C6 chord in a chord of G major. Popmatters praised Braxton, saying "the track seems to be an attempt to make some headway within the lucrative urban R&B market." The song's length is a total of four minutes and twenty-one seconds at a moderately slow, yet steady pace.

The song earned Braxton her sixth Grammy Award for Best Female R&B Vocal Performance in 2001. According to Billboard.com, this song is her last Top 10 appearance on the Billboard Hot 100 to date.

Critical reception
"He Wasn't Man Enough" was widely acclaimed by contemporary music critics. Stephen Thomas Erlewine from AllMusic highlighted the track along with "Gimme Some" as having a "skimmering beat". David Browne from Entertainment Weekly gave it a positive review, certificating it with a B rating. He said "From producer Rodney Jerkins' cushiony pulse to its premise (one woman warning another about her ex-beau), the amenable single "He Wasn't Man Enough" sounds mightily familiar. But it's still no "Scrubs", largely thanks to Braxton's husky, mumbly delivery." NME gave it a positive review, saying that for the track, "Braxton can probably claim the best set of tonsils in soul-pop".

Chart performance
"He Wasn't Man Enough" peaked at number two on the Billboard Hot 100 the week of May 6, 2000, becoming Braxton's sixth and last top-10 single. The song spent 37 weeks on the chart. The song also peaked at number one on the Hot R&B/Hip-Hop Songs for four weeks. The song debuted at number five on the UK Singles Chart on its issue date of April 29, 2000. The song debuted at number six on the Australian Singles Chart and peaked at number five in that country. The song debuted at number 36 on the New Zealand Singles Chart and later rose to number five after seven weeks on the charts. The song received platinum by the Recording Industry Association of New Zealand (RIANZ), selling over 15,000 copies there. The song debuted at number 99 on the French Singles Chart before falling out, then re-entering at number 74 on the charts and eventually peaked at number fifteen, becoming the biggest jump of the issue date of July 1, 2000. The song debuted at number 21 on the Single Top 100, peaked at number five and stayed on the charts for seventeen weeks.

Music video
The music video, directed by Bille Woodruff from February 25–26, 2000, begins with Braxton as an animated superhero who unzips her shirt to ward off villains. Next, she is shown dancing in a red cylinder-like hallway. The shot turns to a club where her ex (portrayed by Braxton's former husband Keri Lewis of R&B group Mint Condition) and his current wife (portrayed by Robin Givens) walk in. Givens looks Braxton up and down and flashes her wedding ring at her. Braxton scoffs because she had had him first and knows of his infidelity.

The video flashes between Braxton dancing in the hallway and the club scene. At one point, the two women are in the club's bathroom, and Braxton informs the new wife why she dumped her husband. They set up an act, wherein Braxton goes into a private room with him and gets him to drop his pants; all the while he is on camera, and everyone at the club, including his current wife, is watching. At the end, Givens busts in and throws the ring at him, and the two women give each other a high five.

The video also features cameo appearances by Rodney Chester and Braxton's sister Tamar. Originally cast to play the husband, actor Michael Jai White ended up dropping out before the video shoot because Givens allegedly took issue with White resembling her former husband Mike Tyson, whom White played in the HBO film Tyson five years earlier. He would appear in the video for Braxton's "Hands Tied" a decade later.

Track listings

US CD and cassette single
 "He Wasn't Man Enough" (album version) – 4:21
 "He Wasn't Man Enough" (instrumental) – 4:19

US and Japanese DVD single
 "He Wasn't Man Enough" (video)
 "Un-Break My Heart" (video)
 Special feature: Interview with Toni

European CD single
 "He Wasn't Man Enough" (radio edit) – 3:58
 "He Wasn't Man Enough" (extended version) – 5:35

UK and Australian CD single
 "He Wasn't Man Enough" (radio edit) – 3:58
 "You're Makin' Me High" (classic edit) – 3:45
 "He Wasn't Man Enough" (extended version) – 5:35
 "He Wasn't Man Enough" (video version) – 4:38

UK cassette single
 "He Wasn't Man Enough" (radio edit) – 3:58
 "You're Makin' Me High" (classic edit) – 3:45
 "He Wasn't Man Enough" (extended version) – 5:35

Credits and personnel
Credits are lifted from The Heat album booklet.

Studio
 Recorded at Larrabee North (Universal City, California)
 Mixed at Enterprise Studios (North Hollywood, California)
 Mastered at Powers House of Sound (New York City)

Personnel

 Rodney Jerkins – writing, background vocals, all instruments, production, arrangement, mixing
 Fred Jerkins III – writing, arrangement
 LaShawn Daniels – writing, vocal production, arrangement
 Harvey Mason, Jr. – writing, recording, Pro Tools
 Toni Braxton – vocals, background vocals
 Nora Payne – background vocals
 Sharlotte Gibson – background vocals
 Steve Baughman – recording assistant
 Dexter Simmons – mixing
 Tyson Leeper – mixing assistant
 Roger Lopez – mixing assistant
 Herb Powers – mastering

Charts

Weekly charts

Year-end charts

Certifications and sales

Release history

References

2000 songs
2000 singles
Arista Records singles
Bertelsmann Music Group singles
Canadian Singles Chart number-one singles
LaFace Records singles
Music videos directed by Bille Woodruff
Number-one singles in Poland
Song recordings produced by Rodney Jerkins
Songs written by Fred Jerkins III
Songs written by Harvey Mason Jr.
Songs written by LaShawn Daniels
Songs written by Rodney Jerkins
Toni Braxton songs